Miloš Glonek (born 26 September 1968) is a former footballer who played internationally for Czechoslovakia (13 caps) and Slovakia (12 caps).

External links

 
 
 

1968 births
Living people
People from Zlaté Moravce
Sportspeople from the Nitra Region
Association football defenders
Slovak footballers
Slovak expatriate footballers
Czechoslovak footballers
Czechoslovakia international footballers
Slovakia international footballers
ŠK Slovan Bratislava players
A.C. Ancona players
Stade Malherbe Caen players
Serie A players
Serie B players
Slovak Super Liga players
Ligue 1 players
Ligue 2 players
Expatriate footballers in France
Slovak expatriate sportspeople in France
Expatriate footballers in Italy
Slovak expatriate sportspeople in Italy
Dual internationalists (football)